Emmaus Baptist Church is a historic Southern Baptist church located near Providence Forge, New Kent County, Virginia. It was built between 1849 and 1852, and is a rectangular, simple nave- plan structure in the Greek Revival style.  It measures 38 feet wide by 50 feet long. Also on the property is a contributing church cemetery that contains 195 tombstones with dates ranging from 1855 to 1989.

It was listed on the National Register of Historic Places in 1993.

References

Churches on the National Register of Historic Places in Virginia
19th-century Baptist churches in the United States
Baptist churches in Virginia
National Register of Historic Places in New Kent County, Virginia
Greek Revival church buildings in Virginia
Churches completed in 1852
Churches in New Kent County, Virginia
1852 establishments in Virginia
Southern Baptist Convention churches